El Croquis (Spanish; translates to English as "The Sketch") is one of the most prestigious architectural magazines in the world.

The leading international architects choose it as their showcase. The volumes dedicated to established Pritzker Prize names like OMA Rem Koolhaas, Kazuyo Sejima, Herzog & de Meuron, Alvaro Siza or Rafael Moneo, are considered their respective oeuvre complète. For emerging architects, being published by El Croquis is a target in itself.

In 1992 it was awarded the Gold Medal for Exports by the Spanish Chamber of Commerce, a rare accomplishment for an architectural journal. In 2014, editors Fernando Marquez Cecilia and Richard Levene received an International Fellowship from RIBA. Writing in Architects' Journal, Greg Pitcher  cited "the exceptional quality of their highly selective publications" and their work in supporting promising young architects, through which they have "created retrospectively an international Who’s Who of the architecture of the late 20th and early 21st centuries."

El Croquis Editorial is also noted for their exhibition gallery in El Escorial (Madrid), housing a large collection of architectural models in constant rotation.

Publications

El Croquis (Architectural Magazine)

Books 
 1 Adolf Loos. Escritos I 1897-1909
 2 Adolf Loos. Escritos II 1910-1933
 3 Otto Wagner. La arquitectura de nuestro tiempo
 4 Le Corbusier. Acerca del Purismo 1918-1926
 5 Mies van der Rohe. La palabra sin artificio 1922-1968
 6 Bruno Taut. 
 7 Frank Lloyd Wright. Autobiografía 1867 [1944]
 8 Alvar Aalto. De palabra y por escrito
 9 Luis Barragán. Escritos y conversaciones
 10 E.G. Asplund. Escritos 1906-1940 Cuaderno de Viaje 1913
 11 Louis I. Kahn. Escritos, conferencias, entrevistas
 12 Moisei Ginzburg. Escritos 1923-1930

Sources

External links
El Croquis website

1982 establishments in Spain
Architecture magazines
Bi-monthly magazines published in Spain
Magazines established in 1982
Magazines published in Madrid
Spanish-language magazines